Geropa concolor is a species of beetle in the family Cerambycidae, the only species in the genus Geropa.

References

Achrysonini